Chisholm Creek is a stream in Sedgwick County, Kansas, in the United States.

Chisholm Creek was named for Jesse Chisholm, a pioneer who settled on the creek in the 1860s.

See also
List of rivers of Kansas

References

Rivers of Sedgwick County, Kansas
Rivers of Kansas